Salome vs. Shenandoah is a 1919 American silent film comedy short directed by Ray Grey, Erle C. Kenton, and Ray Hunt. It starred Ben Turpin, Charles Murray, and Phyllis Haver. It was produced by Mack Sennett and distributed by Famous Players-Lasky and Paramount Pictures.

Cast
Ben Turpin as Actor Playing New General
Charles Murray as Actor Playing Herod (credited as Charlie Murray)
Phyllis Haver as Actress playing Salome
Heinie Conklin as Actor Playing Captain of Artillery / Roman Slave (credited as Charles Conklin)
Marie Prevost as Ingenue Actress
Ford Sterling as Ingenue Actress's Father

unbilled
Billy Bevan - 
Al Cooke -
Annette DeGandis -
Elva Diltz - 
Louise Fazenda - Minor Role (unconfirmed)
Eddie Gribbon - Audience Spectator/A Soldier
Harry Gribbon - Audience Spectator
Harriet Hammond - (unconfirmed)
George Jeske - Actor / Soldier
Fanny Kelly - (unconfirmed)
Patrick Kelly - 
Alice Maison - 
Kathryn McGuire -
Bert Roach - Actor / Soldier
Raymond Russell - Audience Spectator
Sybil Seely - Minor Role
Eva Thatcher - Audience Spectator
Gladys Whitfield - Minor Role

References

External links

1919 short films
American silent short films
American black-and-white films
Films directed by Erle C. Kenton
Silent American comedy films
1919 comedy films
1919 films
1910s American films